The Tacuarembó Formation is a Late Jurassic (Kimmeridgian) geologic formation of the eponymous department in northern Uruguay. The fluvial to lacustrine sandstones, siltstones and mudstones preserve ichnofossils, turtles, crocodylomorphs, fish and invertebrates (bivalves and gastropods).

Fossil content 
The following fossils have been reported from the formation:
 Reptiles
 Meridiosaurus vallisparadisi
 Tacuarembemys kusterae
 cf. Ceratosaurus sp.
 Coelurosauria indet.
 Mesoeucrocodylia indet.
 Testudines indet.
 Theropoda indet.
 Torvosaurus sp. ("Torvosaurus ingens")
 Tacuadactylus luciae
 Fish
 Arganodus tiguidiensis
 Asiatoceratodus cf. tiguidiensis
Mawsonia gigas
 Neoceratodus africanus
 Priohybodus arambourgi
 Halecostomi indet.
 Semionotiformes indet.
 Bivalves
 Diplodon sp.
 Gastropods
 Viviparidae indet.
 Ichnofossils
 Ornithopoda indet.
 Sauropoda indet.
 Theropoda indet.

See also 
 List of fossiliferous stratigraphic units in Uruguay

References

Bibliography 
 
 
 
 
 
 
 
 

Geologic formations of Uruguay
Jurassic System of South America
Jurassic Uruguay
Kimmeridgian Stage
Sandstone formations
Mudstone formations
Siltstone formations
Fluvial deposits
Lacustrine deposits
Ichnofossiliferous formations
Formations
Fossiliferous stratigraphic units of South America
Paleontology in Uruguay
Formations